The Spirit of '67 is the sixth studio album by American rock band Paul Revere & the Raiders. Produced by Terry Melcher and released in November 1966 by Columbia Records (CS 9395), and featured the singles "Hungry", "The Great Airplane Strike", and "Good Thing". The album would be reissued on LP (with the title "Good Thing" and with "Oh! To Be A Man" omitted) by Harmony in 1971, by Sundazed on CD in 1996 (with three bonus tracks) and in 2015 by Friday Music on 180g clear red vinyl.

The album's two biggest chart hits — "Good Thing" and "Hungry" — both feature in Quentin Tarantino's 2019 film Once Upon a Time in Hollywood, as do two other tracks by the band. "Good Thing" also features the film's trailer.

Track listing

Sundazed Records (1996 CD issue, SC 6095)

 "Good Thing" (M. Lindsay, T. Melcher)	 
 "All About Her" (R. Gerhardt, M. Lindsay, T. Melcher)	 
 "In My Community" (P. Volk)	 
 "Louise" (L. Kincaid)	 
 "Why? Why? Why? (Is It So Hard)" (P. Volk)	 
 "Oh! To Be A Man" (M. Lindsay, P. Revere)	 
 "Hungry" (B. Mann, C. Weill)	 
 "Undecided Man" (P. Revere, M. Lindsay)	 
 "Our Candidate" (M. Smith)	 
 "1001 Arabian Nights" (M. Lindsay, T. Mercher)	 
 "The Great Airplane Strike" (P. Revere, T. Melcher, M. Lindsay)
 "(You're A) Bad Girl" (Bonus Track) 
 "Hungry"  (Alternate mix)
 "The Great Airplane Strike"  (Single version)

Personnel
Adapted from the liner notes of Now Sounds 2015 reissue, except where noted:

Paul Revere & the Raiders
Mark Lindsay – lead vocals, percussion
Drake Levin – guitars, backing vocals
Jim "Harpo" Valley – guitars, backing vocals
Phil Volk – bass, backing vocals; lead vocals on "In My Community" and "Why? Why? Why?", acoustic guitar on "In My Community"
Paul Revere – keyboards, backing vocals
Michael "Smitty" Smith – drums, percussion, backing vocals; lead vocals on "Our Candidate"
Additional personnel
Terry Melcher – backing vocals, keyboards; producer, arranger, conductor
Jerry Cole – additional guitars; bass on "Why? Why? Why?"
Hal Blaine – drums, percussion on "Why? Why? Why?" and "Hungry"
Bruce Johnston – keyboards on "All About Her"
Van Dyke Parks – keyboards on "Good Thing" and "Why? Why? Why?"
Mort Garson – strings arranger and conductor on "Undecided Man"

References

External links
 [ The Spirit of '67] at Allmusic

1966 albums
Columbia Records albums
Parlophone albums
Albums produced by Terry Melcher
Paul Revere & the Raiders albums
Albums conducted by Terry Melcher
Albums arranged by Terry Melcher
Albums conducted by Mort Garson
Albums arranged by Mort Garson